The Czech Open was a professional golf tournament on the European Tour which was held annually in the Czech Republic.

The tournament first appeared on the European Tour schedule between 1994 and 1997 as the Chemapol Trophy Czech Open, and was the first European Tour event staged east of the former Iron Curtain after the fall of the Berlin Wall. The first three of those events were held at the Golf Club Mariánské Lázně in Mariánské Lázně, before moving to the Prague Karlstein Golf Club, overlooked by Karlštejn Castle, just outside Prague. Germany's former World Number 1 Bernhard Langer was much the most distinguished of the four champions.

Following flood disasters in the Czech Republic in 1997, the Czech Open in the following year was canceled at the request of the sponsors, and lost its place on the European Tour schedule as a result. In its final year, the prize fund was £804,788, which was above average for a European Tour event at that time.

Having been contested on the satellite Alps Tour in 2008, the Czech Open returned to the European Tour schedule for the 2009 season, when it was played at the Miguel Ángel Jiménez designed Prosper Golf Resort in Čeladná towards the end of July with a prize fund of €2.5 million. It was titled as the Moravia Silesia Open in 2009, and retitled again in 2010 to the Czech Open.  The 2011 Czech Open was the last one held, with the 2012 edition being scheduled, but ultimately canceled due to a lack of funds.

Winners

See also
D+D Real Czech Masters, a European Tour event in the Czech Republic, first played in 2014

Notes

References

External links
Coverage on the European Tour's official site – current event
Coverage on the Alps Tour website – 2008 event

Former European Tour events
Golf tournaments in the Czech Republic
1994 establishments in the Czech Republic
Defunct sports competitions in the Czech Republic